The Sudbury Wolves are an Ontario Hockey League (OHL) ice hockey team based in Sudbury, Ontario, Canada.

Sudbury has had various hockey teams competing at the junior and senior ice hockey levels of the game known as the "Wolves" (or "Cub Wolves") nearly every year since around the time of World War I. The current junior franchise came into existence in 1972 when local businessman Mervin "Bud" Burke purchased the Niagara Falls Flyers and relocated the team to Sudbury. 

The current franchise has never won the Memorial Cup, nor has it captured the J. Ross Robertson Cup. Despite this lack of championships, the team has been one of the top development franchises in major junior over its history, with over 120 players drafted in to the National Hockey League (NHL) since 1973. The Wolves have been a central part of Sudbury's history for decades, and the team is among the most iconic junior hockey franchises in all of North America.

History
Sudbury has had a hockey team known as the Wolves or Cub Wolves nearly every year since around WWI. This team name was informally adopted around 1920 as the "Wolves of the North," likely a reference to the "voracity and tenacity that typified the play of these men from Sudbury." 

The Sudbury Cub Wolves junior team began play in the 1920s as a member of the Nickel Belt Hockey League. Under the management of Max Silverman, and coached by Sam Rothschild, the Cub Wolves won the Memorial Cup in 1932 with a roster that featured future NHL players such as Hector "Toe" Blake, Nakina Smith, and Adélard Lafrance. In 1935, the Cub Wolves lost in the Memorial Cup finals to the Winnipeg Monarchs.

A senior team competing under the banner of the Sudbury Wolves, again coached by Silverman, have twice been chosen to be Canada's representatives at the Ice Hockey World Championships, winning the title for Canada in 1938 and the silver medal in 1949. An iteration of the Wolves competed as the Eastern Canada entry at the 1954 Allan Cup senior national championship, falling to the Penticton Vees from Western Canada.

A professional Sudbury Wolves team competed in the Eastern Professional Hockey League (EPHL) from 1959 until the league folded in 1963. Players such as Don Cherry, Dave Keon, and Gerry Cheevers suited up for the club during its brief existence.

A junior version of the Wolves emerged in the early 1960s as a member of the Northern Ontario Junior Hockey Association, winning the league championship in 1969 and 1971. 

The OHL - then known as the Ontario Hockey Association and later the Ontario Major Junior Hockey League - arrived in Sudbury in 1972 when local businessman Bud Burke, who was a shareholder in the NOJHL Wolves, purchased the Niagara Falls Flyers from Leighton "Hap" Emms and moved the team to Northern Ontario. In 1975-76, the Wolves, coached by Jerry Toppazzini, who won the Matt Leyden Trophy that season, won Hamilton Spectator Trophy for having the best regular season record in the league with a roster of future NHL players such as Randy Carlyle, Ron Duguay, Rod Schutt, and Mike Foligno. Sudbury advanced to the 1975-76 OHL finals, but lost to the Hamilton Fincups in five games. In 1979, Burke sold the team to a large ownership group headed by future Hockey Canada board of directors chair Joe Drago. From 1973 to 1979, a young Joe Bowen began his broadcasting career covering the Wolves on local Sudbury radio.

The Wolves were the worst performing team in the entire Canadian Hockey League (CHL) in the 1980s, making the playoffs only once and not winning a single postseason game in the process. The club did manage to develop some notable players in this era, such as Pat Verbeek and Jeff Brown. A turning point in franchise history came in 1986 when local businessman Ken Burgess purchased the struggling club and initiated a major organizational turnaround. Sam McMaster was hired as general manager in 1988, and under his direction the team experienced renewed success, winning its first playoff series since 1979-80 when they defeated the Oshawa Generals in the first round of 1991-92 OHL playoffs. McMaster was named OHL Executive of the Year in 1989–90.

From the early 1990s to the mid-2000s, the Wolves experienced mixed success. The club lost in Game 7 of the 1994-95 OHL semi-finals to the Detroit Junior Red Wings. A string of disappointing seasons came to an end in 2006–07 - the Wolves' 35th anniversary - when the team advanced to the OHL Finals, but ultimately lost to the Plymouth Whalers in six games. Coached by Mike Foligno, the Wolves roster that season featured several future NHL players, namely Marc Staal, Nick Foligno, Adam McQuaid, and Akim Aliu. 

From 2007 to 2016, the team generally struggled, including posting the worst season in franchise history in 2014-2015. In August 2012, the Wolves were sent to represent Canada at the 2012 Junior Club World Cup. Sudbury defeated the Waterloo Black Hawks of the United States Hockey League in the championship finals by a score of 2-0. In 2016, the Burgess family, at the time the longest-serving ownership group in the OHL, sold the team to Sudbury businessman Dario Zulich. Since Zulich's takeover, the team has been moving in a positive direction, drafting players such as Quinton Byfield and Ukka-Pekka Luukkonen, and winning a regular season division title in 2019-20.

Championships

The current Sudbury Wolves have never won the OHL championship, and have never participated in the Memorial Cup tournament. The team currently holds the third-longest Memorial Cup championship drought in the CHL, and the longest in the OHL.

The team has twice lost in the OHL finals, once in 1976 and again in 2007, winning the 1976 Leyden Trophy and the 2007 Bobby Orr Trophy in the process. The Wolves have twice won the Emms Trophy as the regular season Central Division champions, first in 2000-01 and then in 2019-20.

J. Ross Robertson Cup
 1976 Lost to Hamilton Fincups
 2007 Lost to Plymouth Whalers

Bobby Orr Trophy
 2006–2007 Eastern Conference Champions

NOJHA McNamara Trophy
 1969 Defeated Sault Ste. Marie Greyhounds
 1971 Defeated Sault Ste. Marie Greyhounds

NOJHA Regular Season Champions
 1970–1971 80 pts.

Hamilton Spectator Trophy
 1975–1976 102 points

Leyden Trophy
 1975–1976 Leyden division

Emms Trophy
 2000–2001 Central division
 2019–2020 Central division

Junior Club World Cup
 2012 Defeated Waterloo Black Hawks

Coaches
Jerry Toppazzini was awarded the Matt Leyden Trophy as the league's coach of the year in 1976, leading his team to a first-place finish in the regular season.

List of Sudbury Wolves coaches with multiple years in parentheses.

 1972–1973 - B.MacKenzie, L.Rubic, T.Boyce
 1973–1974 - Mac MacLean
 1974–1975 - Stu Duncan
 1975–1977 - Jerry Toppazzini (2)
 1977–1978 - Marcel Clements, Andy Laing
 1978–1981 - Andy Laing (4)
 1981–1982 - Joe Drago
 1982–1983 - Ken Gratton, M.Clements, B.Harris
 1983–1984 - Billy Harris (2), Andy Spruce
 1984–1985 - Andy Spruce (2)
 1985–1986 - Bob Strumm, Wayne Maxner
 1986–1987 - Guy Blanchard
 1987–1988 - John Wallin, Ken MacKenzie
 1988–1992 - Ken MacKenzie (5)
 1992–1995 - Glenn Merkosky (4)
 1995–1996 - Glenn Merkosky, Todd Lalonde
 1996–1997 - Todd Lalonde (3)
 1997–1998 - Todd Lalonde, Tom Watt
 1998–1999 - Reg Higgs
 1999–2003 - Bert Templeton (4)
 2003–2009 - Mike Foligno (5)
 2009-2010 - Bryan Verreault
 2009-2010 - Mike Foligno
 2010–2013 - Trent Cull
 2013–2015 - Paul Fixter
 2015–2017 - David Matsos (2)
 2017–2020 - Cory Stillman
 2021–2022 - Craig Duncanson
 2022–present - Derek MacKenzie

Players

The Sudbury Wolves have retired five players' numbers, and have had over 120 players drafted to the NHL.

Retired numbers
 # 6 Randy Carlyle,  # 8 Rod Schutt # 10 Ron Duguay # 15 Dale Hunter  # 14 Marc Staal
 # 17 Mike Foligno

Award winners
1975–76 - Jim Bedard, Dave Pinkney Trophy 
1978–79 - Mike Foligno, Red Tilson Trophy, Eddie Powers Memorial Trophy, Jim Mahon Memorial Trophy 
1981–82 - Pat Verbeek, Emms Family Award 
1984 - Dave Moylan, Jack Ferguson Award 
1985–86 - Jeff Brown, Max Kaminsky Trophy 
1987 - John Uniac, Jack Ferguson Award
1993–94 - Jamie Rivers, Max Kaminsky Trophy 
1994–95 - David MacDonald, F. W. "Dinty" Moore Trophy 
1998–99 - Norm Milley, Jim Mahon Memorial Trophy 
1998–99 - Ryan McKie, Dan Snyder Memorial Trophy 
2000–01 - Alexei Semenov, Max Kaminsky Trophy 
2004–05 - Benoit Pouliot, CHL Rookie of the Year, Emms Family Award 
2006–07 - Marc Staal, Max Kaminsky Trophy, Wayne Gretzky 99 Award 
2008 - John McFarland, Jack Ferguson Award 
2009-10 - John Kurtz, Mickey Renaud Captain's Trophy
2011–12 - Michael Sgarbossa, Eddie Powers Memorial Trophy
2012-13 - Connor Burgess, Ivan Tennant Memorial Award
2015 - David Levin, Jack Ferguson Award 
2018 - Quinton Byfield, Jack Ferguson Award 
2018–19 - Ukko-Pekka Luukkonen, Red Tilson Trophy, OHL Goaltender of the Year 
2018–19 - Quinton Byfield, Emms Family Award, CHL Rookie of the Year
2021 - Quentin Musty, Jack Ferguson Award

NHL alumni

Akim Aliu
Mike Allison
Derek Armstrong
John Baby
Ryan Barnes
Don Beaupre
Jim Bedard
Adam Bennett
Jason Bonsignore
Kip Brennan
Jeff Brown
Kyle Capobianco
Randy Carlyle
Tom Colley
Brandon Convery
Frank Corrado
Dean De Fazio
Paul DiPietro
Ron Duguay
Craig Duncanson
Ben Dunn
Dave Farrish
Fedor Fedorov
Mike Fisher
Rory Fitzpatrick
Marcus Foligno
Mike Foligno
Nick Foligno
Jim Fox
Dan Frawley
Sean Gagnon
David Goverde
Josh Gratton
Scott Gruhl
Richie Hansen
Randy Hillier
Randy Holt
Dale Hunter
Dave Hunter
Mike Hudson
Dan Jancevski
Wes Jarvis
Jason Jaspers
Chris Kelly
Chris Kontos
Marc Laforge
Josh Leivo
Mike Lenarduzzi
Kevin MacDonald
Derek MacKenzie
Paul Mara
Hector Marini
Mike Marson
Dan McCarthy
Dale McCourt
John McFarland
Brian McGrattan
Jay McKee
Alex McKendry
Don McLean
Adam McQuaid
Ken McRae
Max Middendorf
Norm Milley
Mike Moher
Barrie Moore
Ethan Moreau
Glen Murray
Zdenek Nedved
Sean O'Donnell
Michael Peca
Randy Pierce
Benoit Pouliot
Taylor Pyatt
Andrew Raycroft
Jamie Rivers
Shawn Rivers
Adam Ruzicka
Warren Rychel
Mike Sands
Rod Schutt
Alexei Semenov
Jason Simon
Brad Smith
Mike Smith
Marc Staal
Steve Staios
Zack Stortini
John Tanner
Eric Vail
Steve Valiquette
Pat Verbeek
Dave Watson
Dennis Wideman
Mike Wilson

Yearly results

Regular season
 1962–1972 NOJHL
 1972–1974 OHA
 1974–1980 OMJHL
 1980–present OHL

Legend: OTL = Overtime loss, SL = Shootout loss

Playoffs
 1972–73 Lost to Ottawa 67's 8 points to 0 in first round.
 1973–74 Lost to Kitchener Rangers 8 points to 0 in first round.
 1974–75 Defeated Ottawa 67's 8 points to 6 in first round. Lost to Toronto Marlboros 9 points to 7 in second round.
 1975–76 Defeated S.S. Marie Greyhounds 9 points to 5 in quarter-finals. Defeated Ottawa 67's 8 points to 2 in semi-finals. Lost to Hamilton Fincups 8 points to 2 in finals.
 1976–77 Lost to Kingston Canadians 4 games to 1 with 1 tie in quarter-finals.
 1977–78 Out of playoffs.
 1978–79 Defeated Oshawa Generals 8 points to 2 in quarter-finals. Lost to Peterborough Petes 8 points to 2 in semi-finals.
 1979–80 Defeated Kingston Canadians 3 games to 0 in first round. Lost to Peterborough Petes 4 games to 3 in quarter-finals.
 1980–81 Out of playoffs.
 1981–82 Out of playoffs.
 1982–83 Out of playoffs.
 1983–84 Out of playoffs.
 1984–85 Out of playoffs.
 1985–86 Lost to Guelph Platers 8 points to 0 in first round.
 1986–87 Out of playoffs.
 1987–88 Out of playoffs.
 1988–89 Out of playoffs.
 1989–90 Lost to Owen Sound Platers 4 games to 3 in first round.
 1990–91 Lost to Oshawa Generals 4 games to 1 in first round.
 1991–92 Defeated Oshawa Generals 4 games to 3 in first round. Lost to North Bay Centennials 4 games to 0 in quarter-finals.
 1992–93 Defeated Newmarket Royals 4 games to 3 in first round. Lost to Peterborough Petes 4 games to 3 in quarter-finals.
 1993–94 Defeated Oshawa Generals 4 games to 1 in division quarter-finals. Lost to Ottawa 67's 4 games to 2 in division semi-finals.
 1994–95 Defeated Kitchener Rangers 4 games to 1 in division quarter-finals. Defeated Windsor Spitfires 4 games to 2 in quarter-finals. Lost to Detroit Jr. Red Wings 4 games to 3 in semi-finals.
 1995–96 Out of playoffs.
 1996–97 Out of playoffs.
 1997–98 Defeated Barrie Colts 4 games to 2 in division quarter-finals. Lost to Guelph Storm 4 games to 0 in quarter-finals.
 1998–99 Lost to Belleville Bulls 4 games to 0 in conference quarter-finals.
 1999–2000 Defeated Kingston Frontenacs 4 games to 1 in conference quarter-finals.  Lost to Barrie Colts 4 games to 3 in conference semi-finals.
 2000–01 Defeated Barrie Colts 4 games to 1 in conference quarter-finals.  Lost to Toronto St. Michael's Majors 4 games to 3 in conference semi-finals.
 2001–02 Lost to Barrie Colts 4 games to 1 in conference quarter-finals.
 2002–03 Out of playoffs.
 2003–04 Lost to Toronto St. Michael's Majors 4 games to 3 in conference quarter-finals.
 2004–05 Defeated Brampton Battalion 4 games to 2 in conference quarter-finals. Lost to Ottawa 67's 4 games to 2 in conference semi-finals.
 2005–06 Defeated Kingston Frontenacs 4 games to 2 in conference quarter-finals. Lost to Peterborough Petes 4 games to 0 in conference semi-finals.
 2006–07 Defeated Mississauga Ice Dogs 4 games to 1 in conference quarter-finals. Defeated Barrie Colts 4 games to 0 in conference semi-finals. Defeated Belleville Bulls 4 games to 2 in conference finals. Lost to Plymouth Whalers 4 games to 2 in finals.
 2007–08 Out of playoffs.
 2008–09 Lost to Belleville Bulls 4 games to 2 in conference quarter-finals.
 2009–10 Lost to Barrie Colts 4 games to 0 in conference quarter-finals.
 2010–11 Defeated Ottawa 67's 4 games to 0 in conference quarter-finals. Lost to Mississauga St. Michael's Majors 4 games to 0 in conference semi-finals.
 2011–12 Lost to Brampton Battalion 4 games to 0 in conference quarter-finals.
 2012–13 Defeated Brampton Battalion 4 games to 1 in conference quarter-finals. Lost to Belleville Bulls 4 games to 0 in conference semi-finals.
 2013–14 Lost to Barrie Colts 4 games to 1 in conference quarter-finals.
 2014–15 Out of playoffs.
 2015–16 Out of playoffs.
 2016–17 Lost to Oshawa Generals 4 games to 2 in conference quarter-finals.
 2017–18 Out of playoffs.
 2018–19 Defeated Mississauga Steelheads 4 games to 0 in conference quarter-finals. Lost to Ottawa 67's 4 games to 0 in conference semi-finals.
 2019–20 Cancelled.
 2020–21 Cancelled.
 2021–22 Out of playoffs.

Uniforms and logos

From 1972 to 1988, the Sudbury Wolves' colours were green, white and gold. The tradition of Sudbury teams wearing green jerseys dates back to the mid-1910s. In 1988–89, Ken Burgess - who famously asked "Who ever heard of a green wolf?" - changed the team's colours to blue, white and grey, which happened to be the corporate colours of the business that bore his name. These have been the Wolves' colours ever since, though the team has occasionally donned throwback green jerseys. The iconic blood-toothed, wily wolf-head logo has subtly evolved since the current franchise's inception, but overall has remained relatively unchanged and today is one of the most recognizable logos in the CHL.

There have been various alterations and versions of the team's primary jersey design over the years, as well as the introduction of third alternate jerseys, such as black and grey ones that were introduced in the mid-1990s and again in the early-2010s. The team unveiled several special edition jerseys during the 2022-23 season, including a fiftieth anniversary jersey, as well as a limited edition Shoresy Sudbury Blueberry Bulldogs themed jersey.

Arena
The Sudbury Wolves play their home games at the downtown Sudbury Community Arena, which was constructed in 1951. The City of Greater Sudbury and the Wolves have upgraded the facility over the years, but since the mid-2010s there have been intensified debates about the building of a new arena.

Every time the Wolves score a goal, a taxidermic wolf rolls out on a pulley system from the rafters of the Sudbury Arena in the direction of the opposing team's bench. This tradition began in the 1950s when The Sudbury Star donated a stuffed wolf to the local Wolves team as a token of appreciation.

Media
In the 2009-10 hockey season, Wolves games were broadcast on CJTK-FM in Sudbury. As of 2018, Wolves games are broadcast on CKLU-FM.

See also
 List of ice hockey teams in Ontario

References

External links
Sudbury Wolves
www.sudburymuseums.ca History of hockey in Sudbury
Sudbury Wolves fan site

Ontario Hockey League teams
Sports teams in Greater Sudbury
Ice hockey clubs established in 1962
1962 establishments in Ontario
Ice hockey teams representing Canada internationally